Kengtung District (also spelled Kengtong) is a district of the Shan State in Myanmar. It consists of three towns and 1449 villages.

Townships

The district contains the following townships:
Kengtung Township, Kengtung is the largest, most mountainous, most easterly, and culturally the farthest from the Burmese, of all the Shan States. Geography makes approach to it from the rest of Burma difficult for it lies not only beyond the Salween across which no bridge has been built and whose eastern tributaries have cut no easy routes through the serried north-south ranges, but nearer again to the Mekong than to the Salween.
Mong Khet Township
Mong Yang Township
Mong La Township
Mong Ping Township

Mat Man Township, Matman (Maman) Township became part of Hopang District instead part of Kengtung District after September 2011.

References

Districts of Myanmar
Kengtung